The qualification for the 2012 AFC U-19 Championship.

Format 
The teams have been divided into two zones – West (23) and East (16). The teams will be divided into seven groups of six and five teams each. West Zone will have three groups of six and one of five teams while East will have one group of six teams each and two of five. Top two teams from each of the groups and third best team from West and East zones will qualify for the tournament proper.

Seedings 
The draw for the 2012 AFC U-19 Championship qualification will take place at AFC House on 30 March 2011.

 – Suspended

Groups

Group A 
All matches were played in Dhaka, Bangladesh (UTC+6).

Group B 
All matches were played in Doha, Qatar (UTC+3).

Group C 
All matches were played in Tehran, Iran (UTC+3:30).

Group D 
All matches were played in Fujairah, United Arab Emirates (UTC+4).

Group E 
All matches were played in Bangkok, Thailand (UTC+7).

Group F 
All matches were played in Ho Chi Minh City, Vietnam (UTC+7).

Group G 
All matches were held in Petaling Jaya (Selangor), Malaysia (UTC+8).

Third-placed qualifiers 
At the end of the first stage, a comparison will be made between the third placed teams of each group. The one best third-placed teams from the West Zone (Group A to D) and one best third-placed team from the East (Group E to G) would also advanced to the AFC U-19 Championship 2012.

West Zone 
Because three groups has one team fewer than the others, following the withdrawal of Afghanistan and Nepal, matches against the sixth-placed team in each group are not included in this ranking. As a result, four matches played by each team will count for the purposes of the third-placed table.

East Zone

Qualifiers

See also
2012 AFC U-16 Championship qualification

References

External links
AFC U19 Championship

2012
Qual
Qual